Crack climbing is a type of rock climbing in which the climber follows a crack in the rock and uses specialized climbing techniques. The sizes of cracks vary from those that are just barely wide enough for the fingers to fit inside, to those that are so wide that the entire body can fit inside with all limbs outstretched. Many traditional climbing routes follow crack systems, as they provide natural opportunities for placing protective equipment.

Widths 
In the context of climbing, cracks are classified by their width in relation to the climber's body: finger, off-finger, hand, off-width, and chimneys. 
 Finger cracks are just wide enough for all or part of the finger to fit inside; this width incorporates techniques used in face climbing and tends to favor climbers with small hands.  
 Off-finger cracks are wider than finger cracks, but not large enough for the entire hand to fit inside. 
 Hand cracks are just large enough for the entire hand to fit inside; the techniques for this width are "readily learned and very secure". 
 Off-width cracks are wider than hand cracks, but not wide enough for the entire body to fit inside; this width requires movements that can be physically awkward or uncomfortable. 
 Chimney cracks are large enough to fit the entire body inside, allowing for a wide variety of techniques depending on the distance between the two rock faces.

The walls of crack systems rarely run parallel to each other throughout the entire length of the crack; they frequently constrict inwards and open outwards in various places. Some of the most challenging climbs follow cracks which run through many different widths. Even when a crack is uniform in width, it may require a different approach for each individual climber—a hand crack for a smaller climber may be an off-finger crack for a larger climber.

History 

Throughout the history of rock climbing, whenever traditional climbers seek to develop routes in a new area, they almost invariably follow crack systems which offer natural locations for placing protective equipment. The use of the term "line" as a synonym for "route" derives from this practice, as cracks often form visually distinct lines that can be followed from base to top.

Prior to the introduction of spring-loaded camming devices, there was no suitable method for placing protective gear in cracks wider than a few inches, which made such routes extremely dangerous even when they were not technically demanding. It was not until the 1980s that camming devices proliferated, enabling climbers to safely ascend more crack systems.

By the 1990s, crack climbing had diminished in popularity for a variety of reasons. The advent of sport climbing allowed climbers to focus on difficulty and aesthetic appeal when developing new routes; it was no longer necessary to learn specialized crack techniques in order to lead climb safely. Furthermore, cracks are difficult to simulate in climbing gyms, so those who train indoors are limited to face routes when they climb outside.

In 2006, Canadian Sonnie Trotter made the first free ascent of the Cobra Crack (5.14b) in Squamish, British Columbia, which at the time was considered to be the hardest crack climb in the world. Since this ascent, new and perhaps more difficult crack lines have been climbed including Stranger than Fiction (5.14b) in Canyonlands National Park, The Meltdown (5.14c) in Yosemite National Park, Blackbeard's Tears (5.14c) on the California coast and The Recovery Drink (5.14c) in Norway's Jossingfjord.

The crack was first attempted in 2001, and is considered the hardest off-width crack climb in the world.

Technique 

The most fundamental technique used in crack climbing is "jamming", in which the climber forces a body part into the crack such that it exerts force on both walls. This creates the friction needed for the climber to make upward progress. The body part used and its positioning are largely dependent on the width of the crack. For example, some cracks are just wide enough that they can be jammed with an open hand. A crack slightly wider than that may require the hand to be curled into a fist to form an effective jam.

When the crack is too wide for a single limb to jam, climbers use a technique known as "stacking": both hands are placed inside the crack, pressed against each other. For example, if the crack is too wide for a fist jam, the climber may press a closed fist against one wall and an open hand upon the other in order to span the width of the crack. The "stemming" technique, used on cracks that are wider than the climber's body, employs a similar principle. The four limbs are pressed straight outwards against opposing rock faces; limbs are moved upward one at a time while maintaining contact with the other three limbs.

Equipment 

In traditional climbing, the climber places protective gear while ascending the route, rather than installing permanent fixtures beforehand. Much of this equipment was designed specifically for use in crack systems. The two main categories of protection are passive, with no moving parts, and active, which use springs to keep the gear fixed in place. In both categories, protective gear is color-coded by size to allow the climber to quickly identify the correct piece of gear for a given position while climbing.

Nuts and hexes are two common types of passive protection. A nut is a small rectangular piece of metal on the end of a wire cable, with a loop at the other end for attaching a carabiner. The nut is placed inside a crack, just above a constriction in width. This prevents the equipment from slipping downward or out of the crack when the climber falls. The irregular shape of hexes allow them to be placed in several different orientations depending on the shape of the crack.

The spring-loaded camming device was developed in Yosemite National Park the 1970s, and is now one of the most popular forms of protection. Each camming device has three or four cams, a shaft, and a trigger mechanism. When the trigger is engaged, the cams contract, allowing it to be placed inside the crack. The trigger is then released, causing the cams to expand outward against the walls of the crack. The device is designed to convert a downward pull on the shaft into outward force through the cams.

Grading 

There are several different systems used to rate the difficulty of climbing routes. In North America, the most commonly used scale is the Yosemite Decimal System. Most crack climbs are rated between 5.0 and 5.15d, where the first "5" indicates that the route is a technical climb (as opposed to a scramble or walking trail), and the second number indicates the difficulty. A 5.6 crack is an easy climb, usually less steep than vertical, and with numerous accompanying face holds. Cracks rated 5.12 or above are considered advanced, typically due to an overhanging angle, a lack of face holds, or because the crack has poor or flaring jams. At the upper end of the scale, the grades are further subdivided by appending the letters a through d. For example, 5.13c is easier than 5.13d, both of which are less difficult than 5.14a.

References 

Types of climbing